Saimoni Rokini (born 9 December 1972) is a Fijian rugby union footballer.  He plays as a centre. His nickname is Rocky.

He is 1.88m tall and weighs 89 kg. He scored a try on his debut in the Epson Cup clash against Japan in May 2000 after some fine early season form with Suva had caught former coach Greg Smith's attention.

He has played two seasons of sevens with the national team, winning in Hong Kong in 1998 and 1999. In August 2000, he played for the Penguins when they won the Middlesex Charity 7s at Twickenham. He also provided ideal backline cover in 2001 following injuries to Marika Vunibaka, Vilimoni Delasau and Seremaia Bai, eventually securing a regular run-on spot at centre in the Pacific Rim finals in Japan where he came into his own in some physically demanding matches. He was recalled into the Fiji sevens team to Hong Kong in 2004 where he skippered the team. He is also a cousin of Fiji sevens coach, Waisale Serevi.

External links
 Profile

1972 births
Living people
People from Lomaiviti Province
Fijian rugby union players
Rugby union wings
Fiji international rugby union players
Male rugby sevens players
I-Taukei Fijian people
Commonwealth Games medallists in rugby sevens
Commonwealth Games silver medallists for Fiji
Rugby sevens players at the 1998 Commonwealth Games
Medallists at the 1998 Commonwealth Games